The Blairgowrie Advertiser is a Scottish newspaper covering the Blairgowrie area. The paper is owned by Reach plc.

External links 
The Blairgowrie Advertiser Website

Newspapers published in Scotland
Blairgowrie and Rattray
Newspapers published by Reach plc